Fernando Martin Forestieri (born 15 January 1990) is a professional footballer who plays as a second striker for Malaysia Super League club Johor Darul Ta'zim. Born in Argentina, he is a former Italy youth international.

Club career
Born in Rosario, Argentina, by Italian parents, Forestieri's career began in 2003 with Newell's Old Boys. Later on that year, when he was just 13, Boca Juniors bought Forestieri for $50,000. With his parents returning home, Forestieri left Boca to join Genoa at the age of 16.

Genoa
In January 2006, Genoa signed Forestieri on a three-year contract. Boca tried to keep the young player, but failed to do so. In March, Boca contested the regularity of the transfer and, refusing a €300,000 indemnification from Genoa, the Argentine club submitted the case to the AFA. That summer he played some friendly matches with Genoa, and in one of them Torino president Urbano Cairo saw Forestieri in action and offered €500,000 for him, but Genoa refused.

On 8 November 2006, Forestieri made his official debut with Genoa in a Coppa Italia loss against Empoli. Forestieri made his Serie B league debut on 13 January 2007, on an away match lost 2–1 to Pescara, by scoring for Genoa. He then played as a regular with the Genoa Primavera youth team that won the 2007 International Viareggio trophy.

On 25 July 2007, Siena announced that they had signed Forestieri from Genoa in a co-ownership deal, for €1.7 million, to compensate the transfer debt to Siena involving the transfers of Andrea Masiello and Abdoulay Konko to Genoa. He made his Serie A debut on 26 September, coming off the bench in a match against Atalanta. On 13 January 2008, Forestieri scored his first goal for Siena after being brought on as a substitute against Internazionale in a 3–2 loss.

On 25 June 2008, Genoa acquired the entirety of his transfer rights for €4.5 million (with Siena acquiring half of Manuel Coppola for €1.5 million and the full rights of Abdelkader Ghezzal for €3.5 million), successively loaning him out to Siena for another season, but in the first part of the season with coach Giampaolo he played only in two games.

In January 2009, he was loaned to Vicenza in Serie B, where he scored 5 goals in 19 appearances.

Udinese
In July 2009 Forestieri agreed for a move to La Liga, joining Málaga on loan from Genoa and Udinese. He was sold to Udinese Calcio in co-ownership deal on 28 July, for €1.5million. He scored his only goal for the club on 20 December 2009 in 2–1 win against Mallorca.

In summer 2010 he failed to find a new club and stayed at Udinese's youth team. Udinese held some club friendlies for players pending to leave, credited the team as Udinese B. He failed to leave the club and played for Udinese's Primavera youth team.

In January 2011 he had been sent to Serie B club Empoli.

On 15 July 2011 he was signed by newly relegated Serie B team Bari along with Zdeněk Zlámal., which Udinese bought him outright from Genoa on 7 July. He would be a potential replacement of Paulo Vitor Barreto who was bought back by Udinese in June.

Watford
On 31 August 2012, Watford signed Forestieri on loan from Udinese. He scored his first goal against Huddersfield Town on 29 September and then got sent off three days later against Charlton Athletic. Watford goalkeeper Manuel Almunia has claimed to see likenesses to Lionel Messi and says he has a bright future, but must avoid getting involved with referees. Forestieri scored his second Watford goal against Leicester City in November which proved to be the decider as Watford emerged as 2–1 winners.

On Monday 14 January 2013, the striker signed a permanent five-and-a-half-year deal with the club. Forestieri scored his first goals as a permanent Watford player against Sheffield Wednesday on 5 March 2013 – netting a brace at Vicarage Road in an emotional 2–1 win where Forestieri was spotted crying and kissing the Watford badge after the final whistle, and three weeks later Forestieri scored another brace, this time against Burnley on 29 March 2013.

Sheffield Wednesday
After a below par 2014–15 season (despite winning promotion to Premier League) with Watford, scoring only 5 goals in 25 games, mixed with the combination of constant manager changes, Forestieri found himself sliding down the pecking order at Vicarage Road. Forestieri found himself subject to immense interest from clubs in the Championship including Leeds, Reading and Sheffield Wednesday. On 29 August 2015 Sheffield Wednesday completed the signing of Forestieri on a four-year deal, for an undisclosed fee believed to be around £3,000,000. He became the 14th summer signing by the Owls, and the 3rd to move from Vicarage Road to Hillsborough along with Lewis McGugan and Daniel Pudil. He made his Owls debut in the 3–1 away defeat to Burnley on 12 September. He was Wednesday's top goalscorer with 15 in all competitions.

Forestieri won the Player of the Year award at the end of the 2015–16 season. On 9 January 2017, Forestieri extended his contract with Sheffield Wednesday by a further year, committing until the summer of 2020. On 24 June 2020, it was announced that he had declined a new contract and would be leaving the club on the 30 June.

Return to Udinese
On 8 September 2020, Forestieri agreed a return to Udinese on a two-year deal. During the 2021–22 season Forestieri played 4 times, scoring 2 goals and providing 1 assist in only 54 minutes of football. After limited opportunities and despite an outstanding free kick goal for Udinese in November 2021 against Genoa Fernando was released from his Udinese contract by mutual consent in December 2021. Fernando had scored 4 goals in 28 games during his second spell at the club.

Johor Darul Ta'zim
In January 2022, Forestieri left Udinese and headed to Asia, joining Malaysian giants Johor Darul Ta'zim on a two-year contract. He won his first ever trophy in club football shortly after, when JDT defeated Kuala Lumpur City 3–0 to win the Piala Sumbangsih (Charity Shield), with one of the goals scored by Forestieri on his debut.

International career
After declining a call-up to the Argentina under-17 team, Forestieri was called up by Italy for its U-17, U-19 and U-20 football teams. On 13 April 2011 he made his debut with the Italy U-21 team in a friendly game against Russia.

Style of play 
A technical and flexible player, he is a trequartista, but he can also act as a second striker or as an outside forward in a 4-3-3. He is quick and has excellent dribbling and shooting, and can create numerical superiority thanks to his one-on-one ability. Throughout his career he has developed a great ability to adapt to playing in different roles. He has also been seen playing as a trequartista, a winger on both sides and occasionally as a forward, making him a real offensive wild card. A good penalty taker, he has a good shot from distance. With a low centre of gravity, he is able to slip easily in one-on-one situations. For this reason, the coach Jos Luhukay in his seasons at Sheffield Wednesday often played him as a right winger in a 4-2-3-1 or as a wide midfielder in a 4-4-2. Thus abandoning his initial deployment in central roles with a few exceptions, he is sometimes deployed as a second forward in a 4-4-2 to act as a link around a physical centre forward.

Legal issues
Forestieri was accused of racially abusing opposition player Krystian Pearce in a pre-season friendly. He was charged by police, and on 28 December 2018, an arrest warrant was issued after Forestieri failed to attend court. He was found not guilty by a court in March 2019, but was charged with racial abuse by the Football Association. The FA found him guilty and issued a six-game ban, which he said he intended to appeal.

Career statistics

Honours

Club
Johor Darul Ta'zim
 Malaysia Charity Shield: 2022,
 Malaysia FA Cup: 2022
Malaysia Super League: 2022
Malaysia Cup: 2022

Individual
Sheffield Wednesday
PFA Fans' Player of the Month Award: March 2016

References

External links

1990 births
Living people
Footballers from Rosario, Santa Fe
Argentine emigrants to Italy
Citizens of Italy through descent
Argentine footballers
Italian footballers
Association football forwards
Genoa C.F.C. players
A.C.N. Siena 1904 players
Málaga CF players
L.R. Vicenza players
Udinese Calcio players
Empoli F.C. players
S.S.C. Bari players
Watford F.C. players
Sheffield Wednesday F.C. players
Johor Darul Ta'zim F.C. players
Serie A players
Serie B players
La Liga players
English Football League players
Malaysia Super League players
Italy under-21 international footballers
Italy youth international footballers
Argentine expatriate footballers
Italian expatriate footballers
Expatriate footballers in England
Expatriate footballers in Spain
Expatriate footballers in Malaysia
Argentine expatriate sportspeople in England
Argentine expatriate sportspeople in Spain
Italian expatriate sportspeople in England
Italian expatriate sportspeople in Spain